Engines named Kestrel include:

 Aircraft piston engine, built by Rolls-Royce
 Rocket engine built by SpaceX